The Koreshan State Historic Site is a state park in Lee County, Florida located on U.S. Highway 41 at Corkscrew Road. It was also added to the National Register of Historic Places on May 4, 1976, under the designation of Koreshan Unity Settlement Historic District.

It contains areas of pine flatwoods habitat and the site of a religious colony, the Koreshan Unity, whose last members deeded the land to the state in 1961. Recent aerial video footage of the site.

Flora 
The Koreshans imported a wide range of plant species from across the world, including: an Araucaria bidwillii (false monkey puzzle) tree, which is indigenous to Queensland, Australia, and drops seed pods as large as a football; a number of sausage trees, which are native to Africa and a favored food of giraffes; eucalyptus,  mango and other fruit bearing trees; an extraordinary amount of Japanese bamboo that originally hails from the Edison and Ford Winter Estates; and many flowering trees and plants of a wide variety.

Fauna 
Among the wildlife of the park are gopher tortoises, bobcats, gray foxes, North American river otters and American alligators. Birds spotted include swallow-tailed kites, bald eagles, northern bobwhites and red-shouldered hawks.

Recreational activities 
Activities include fishing, picnicking, and boating, as well as camping, canoeing, hiking, and wildlife viewing. Amenities include a campground, boat ramp, canoe rentals, trails and a picnic area on the Estero River.  Beach activities along the Gulf, and kayak rentals on the river are available within a relatively short distance outside the park.

Hours 
Florida state parks are open between 8 a.m. and sundown every day of the year (including holidays).

Gallery

External links 

 Koreshan State Park at Florida State Parks
 Unofficial site of the Koreshan State Historic Site - history of the Koreshans
 Koreshan Historic Collection - The Koreshan Historic Collection presents a photo-journal documenting the daily life of the Koreshan settlement in Southwest Florida.

State parks of Florida
National Register of Historic Places in Lee County, Florida
Museums in Lee County, Florida
Religious museums in Florida
Open-air museums in Florida
Protected areas established in 1961
Parks in Lee County, Florida
1961 establishments in Florida